Vyner, Rajah of Sarawak, GCMG, full name Charles Vyner de Windt Brooke (26 September 1874 – 9 May 1963) was the third and last White Rajah of the Raj of Sarawak.

Early life
The son of Charles Brooke and his wife Margaret de Windt (Ranee Margaret of Sarawak), Vyner was born in London and spent his youth there, being educated at Clevedon, Winchester College, and Magdalene College, Cambridge. He then entered the Sarawak public service.

Vyner served as aide-de-camp to his father 1897–1898, district officer of Simanggang 1898–1901, Resident of Mukah and Oya, 1902–1903, Resident of the Third Division 1903–1904, President of the Law Courts 1904–1911, vice-president of the Supreme and General Councils 1904–1911.

In his military career, he was commissioned as a Second Lieutenant into the 3rd County of London Yeomanry (Sharpshooters) on 12 May 1911, but resigned from the (County of London) Battalion (Artist's Rifles) on 21 May 1913. During the First World War he served incognito as a rating in a naval anti-aircraft defence unit, and as a fitter in an aeroplane manufacturing works at Shoreditch, East London.

He was granted the personal style of His Highness by command of King George V, 22 June 1911. It was in the United Kingdom he met and married The Hon. Sylvia Brett, daughter of Lord Esher, on 21 February 1911.  They returned to Sarawak.

Rajah of Sarawak
Following the death of his father, Vyner succeeded on 17 May and was proclaimed Rajah on 24 May 1917 at Kuching.  He took the oath before the Council Negri on 22 July 1918.  Vyner's early years as Rajah (a role he performed in tandem with his younger brother, Bertram, in accord with their father's wish) saw a boom in the Sarawak rubber and oil industries and the subsequent rise in the Sarawak economy allowed him to modernise the country's institutions, including the public service, and introduce a penal code developed on British India lines in 1924.

Granted a knighthood in 1927, Vyner continued to run a hands-off and relatively popular administration that banned Christian missionaries and fostered indigenous traditions (to an extent: headhunting was outlawed).  Sarawak, however, was not immune to Japanese imperial ambition, which manifested itself in Sarawak on 25 December 1941.  In that same year, he withdrew £200,000 from the Treasury for his personal expenses, in exchange for limiting his powers by a new constitution. Vyner and his family were visiting Sydney, where he would remain for the duration of the war. 

The Daily Telegraph described him as "a cloud-living Old Wykehamist, ... one of the few monarchs left in the world who could still say l'Etat, c'est moi." Similarly, his Who's Who entry read thus: "Has led several expeditions into the far interior of the country to punish headhunters; understands the management of natives; rules over a population of 500,000 souls and a country"  in extent.

Abdication and later life
Vyner returned to Sarawak on 15 April 1946 and temporarily resumed power as Rajah, until 1 July 1946 when he ceded Sarawak to the British government as a crown colony, thus ending White Rajah rule in Sarawak. Vyner died in London at No. 13, Albion Street, Bayswater, W2 on 9 May 1963, four months before Sarawak as well as Malaya, North Borneo and Singapore joined to form the Federation of Malaysia on 16 September 1963.

His nephew, Anthony Brooke, served in various departments in the civil service including the Land and Registry Office, and as a magistrate. Since 1937 he had also been Rajah Muda (crown prince) of Sarawak, because Vyner had three daughters but no son. Anthony opposed cession to Britain, as did a majority of the native members of the Council Negri (Parliament), and they campaigned against it for five years.

The anti-cession movement came to a head in 1948 when the second British governor to Sarawak, Duncan Stewart, was assassinated by a young nationalist named Rosli Dhobi in Sibu. Suspicion fell on Anthony for orchestrating the killing but declassified documents from the British National Archive later showed that he had no connection to the plot. In 1951, Anthony finally renounced his claim to Sarawak's throne and lived out the later part of his life in New Zealand where he died at the age of 98 on 2 March 2011.

Vyner, his father, his brother Bertram, the Tuan Muda, and Rajah James, are buried in St Leonard's Church in the village of Sheepstor on Dartmoor.

Family
He was survived by three daughters, whose names could be preceded by the Malay honorific of Dayang (Lady):
 Leonora Margaret, Countess of Inchcape, wife of the Second Earl of Inchcape (one son, Lord Tanlaw, and one daughter) and, subsequently after his death, of US Colonel Francis Parker Tompkins (one son).
 Elizabeth, a RADA-educated singer and actress, wife of firstly Harry Roy (one son and one daughter), and secondly, Richard Vidmer until her death.
 Nancy Valerie, an actress, known for The Charge of the Light Brigade, wife of firstly, Robert Gregory, an American wrestler; secondly, José Pepi Cabarro – a Spanish businessman; thirdly, Andrew Aitken Macnair (one son, Stewart, born 1952); and fourthly, Memery Whyatt.  She died in Florida.

Legacy
The ship SS Vyner Brooke was named after him.

A species of lizard endemic to Sarawak, Dasia vyneri, is named in his honor.

References

1874 births
1963 deaths
People from Greenwich
Alumni of Magdalene College, Cambridge
Charles Vyner Brooke
People educated at Winchester College
Southeast Asian monarchs
Knights Grand Cross of the Order of St Michael and St George
Burials in Devon
3rd County of London Yeomanry (Sharpshooters) officers
Artists' Rifles officers
Monarchs who abdicated